The Northern Power Distribution Company of Telangana is the electricity distribution company owned by the government of Telangana for the 18 northern districts of Telangana with Hanumakonda as the headquarters.

History

The Northern Power Distribution Company of Telangana was incorporated under Companies Act 1956 and commenced its operations on 2 June 2014 with Warangal as its headquarters. It is successor to APNPDCL which in turn APSEB.APNPDCL

Its first chairman and managing director was Kathikeya Mishra, who was succeeded by Venkatanaraya Narayana and then by the third and present chairman and managing director Annamaneni Gopal Rao.

Network

The power company encompasses 18 districts: Mancherial, Nirmal, Kumram Bheem, Kamareddy, Peddapalli, Jagtial, Rajanna, Warangal, Hanumakonda, Mahabubabad, Mulugu, Prof Jayashankar, Jangaon, Bhadradri Kothagudem, Adilabad, Nizamabad, Karimnagar and Khammam districts. Its network reaches a population of about 1.55 crores spread across villages and towns surrounding an area of 66,860 km2. In order to overcome the shortage of power in the state, solar power is also considered.

See also
Telangana State Southern Power Distribution Company Limited
Telangana Power Generation Corporation
Transmission Corporation of Telangana

References

State agencies of Telangana
Energy in Telangana
Electric power distribution network operators in India
Indian companies established in 2014
Energy companies established in 2014
2014 establishments in Telangana